Jerry Reuss (born June 19, 1949)—pronounced "royce"—is a former left-handed pitcher in Major League Baseball, best known for his years with the Los Angeles Dodgers.

Reuss played for eight teams in his major league career; along with the Dodgers (1979–87), he played for the St. Louis Cardinals (1969–71), Houston Astros (1972–73), and Pittsburgh Pirates (1974–78).  At the end of his career (1987–90), he played for the Cincinnati Reds, California Angels, Chicago White Sox, Milwaukee Brewers, and the Pirates again (Reuss is one of only two Pirates to have played for Danny Murtaugh, Chuck Tanner, and Jim Leyland, the other being John Candelaria). With the Dodgers, he won the 1981 World Series over the New York Yankees. In  he became the second pitcher in history, joining Milt Pappas, to win 200 career games without ever winning 20 in a single season.

Career
Reuss was drafted in the second round of the 1967 Major League Baseball draft by the Cardinals after graduating from Ritenour High School in Overland, Missouri.  He won his first Major League game in 1969, and became part of the starting rotation in 1970.

Cardinals General Manager Bing Devine, under owner Gussie Busch's directive, was unwilling to give more than $20,000. Reuss also grew a mustache that raised Busch's ire. When Reuss refused to bend on the salary issue, Busch directed Devine to "get rid of him". Devine then traded Reuss to the Astros for Scipio Spinks and Lance Clemons on April 15, 1972. The trade looked like a fairly even swap at the time. While Spinks had shuttled between Houston and their top minor league affiliate, the Oklahoma City 89ers, over the last three years, he had been almost unhittable during his minor league stints. However, Spinks never recovered from a freak knee injury suffered on July 4, 1972 and was out of baseball by 1976.

During his two seasons with the Astros, Reuss led the National League in walks with 117 in 1973. After being traded to the Pirates on October 31, 1973, he responded, "I'm surprised because the Astros received only a second‐string catcher for me. I thought I was worth more than Milt May."

In 1980 Reuss had one of the best seasons of his career with 18 wins and only six losses, and leading the majors in shutouts with six. He also threw a no-hitter against the San Francisco Giants on June 27, striking out only two batters, narrowly missing a perfect game due to a throwing error in the first inning by shortstop Bill Russell. Reuss's no-hitter is just one of ten in baseball history in which a pitcher did not walk or hit a batter, but whose perfect game bid was foiled by a fielding error. Reuss finished second behind Steve Carlton in the running for the Cy Young Award, and won the Sporting News Comeback Player of the Year Award.

In  Reuss went 10–4 with a career-low 2.30 ERA in a strike-shortened season, and won two postseason games including one against the New York Yankees in the 1981 World Series, helping the Dodgers win the title. On June 11, 1982, Jerry Reuss recorded 27 consecutive outs in a game, with only the opponent's leadoff batter reaching base (double by Reds' Eddie Milner, who reached third on a sacrifice bunt and scored on a fielder's choice).

He then played for the Reds, going 0–5 before getting released again, and then for the Angels before becoming a free agent. Reuss then signed with the Chicago White Sox on March 29, 1988, having a 13–9 season and earning his 200th career win that year. He was acquired by the Milwaukee Brewers, in need of a veteran fifth starter for its pennant drive, from the White Sox for Brian Drahman at the trade deadline on July 31, 1989. He played a few more seasons before retiring in 1990.

Retirement

Reuss became a baseball broadcaster, working nationally for ESPN from 1991 to 1993, and was also a color commentator for the California/Anaheim Angels from 1996-98.  He served as a pitching coach with the minor league Iowa Cubs before returning to broadcasting with the Dodgers from 2006-2008, serving as a color commentator alongside Rick Monday.

Jerry has also broadcast for the Las Vegas Stars (1994, 1995, and 1999), the Las Vegas 51's (2005-2018) and the Las Vegas Aviators (2019-current).

In 2014, Reuss's autobiography, Bring In the Right Hander!, was published by University of Nebraska Press. Library Journal called Reuss "a gifted storyteller" who describes "what it's like to be both an aspiring teenage ballplayer newly signed to a contract and a 40-year-old athlete clinging to the baseball life he loves so much."

On January 31, 2016, Jerry was inducted into the Missouri Sports Hall of Fame located in Springfield, Missouri. Jerry was inducted into the St. Louis Sports Hall of Fame on May 23, 2019.

See also

 List of Houston Astros team records
 List of Los Angeles Dodgers no-hitters
 List of Major League Baseball annual shutout leaders
 List of Major League Baseball career games started leaders
 List of Major League Baseball career innings pitched leaders
 List of Major League Baseball career strikeout leaders
 List of Major League Baseball career wins leaders
 List of Major League Baseball no-hitters
 List of Major League Baseball players who played in four decades
 Los Angeles Dodgers award winners and league leaders

References

External links

SABR biography
Jerry Reuss - Baseballbiography.com
Bring In the Right Hander!

1949 births
Living people
Baseball players from St. Louis
Major League Baseball pitchers
Los Angeles Dodgers players
Houston Astros players
St. Louis Cardinals players
Chicago White Sox players
Pittsburgh Pirates players
Cincinnati Reds players
California Angels players
Milwaukee Brewers players
National League All-Stars
Major League Baseball broadcasters
Los Angeles Dodgers announcers
Gulf Coast Cardinals players
Cedar Rapids Cardinals players
Tulsa Oilers (baseball) players
Arkansas Travelers players
Columbus Mudcats players
Tucson Toros players
Buffalo Bisons (minor league) players
Nashville Sounds players